King's College School, also known as Wimbledon, KCS, King's and KCS Wimbledon, is a public school (day school, no boarding) in Wimbledon, southwest London, England. The school was founded in 1829 by King George IV, as the junior department of King's College London and had part of the school's premises in Strand, prior to relocating to Wimbledon in 1897.

KCS is a member of the Eton Group of schools. It is predominantly a boys' school but accepts girls into the Sixth Form. In the Sixth Form pupils can choose between the International Baccalaureate and A-Level qualifications.

History 

A royal charter by King George IV founded the school in 1829 as the junior department of the newly established King's College, London. The school occupied the basement of the college in The Strand.

Most of its original eighty-five pupils lived in the city within walking distance of the school. During the early Victorian Era, the school grew in numbers and reputation. Members of the teaching staff included Gabriele Rossetti, who taught Italian. His son, Dante Gabriel, joined the school in 1837. The best known of the early masters was the water-colourist, John Sell Cotman. Nine of his pupils became practising artists and ten architects. By 1843 there were five hundred pupils and the need for larger premises eventually led to the move to Wimbledon in 1897.

The school was progressive in its curriculum in many areas and appointed its first science master in 1855, at a time when very few schools taught science. The first head, John Richardson Major, served the school 1831–1866. 99 of the school's pupils from this period appear in the Dictionary of National Biography.

Until the 1880s, the school flourished. In 1882, only Eton College surpassed the total of thirty Oxford and Cambridge Board examination certificates obtained by pupils at KCS. But the school's teaching facilities were becoming increasingly inadequate as many competitor schools moved to new sites with modern facilities and large playing fields. In 1897, falling numbers of pupils prompted the move to the school's present site in Wimbledon, a fast-growing suburb well served by the railway lines from Surrey and south London. A separate junior school was opened on the same campus in 1912.

In World War I, many letters were written to the school, including some from the Battle of the Somme. During World War II, the school's Great Hall was damaged by bomb shrapnel, and some of the damage can still be seen on the outside of the hall.

The only remaining link between KCS and its former parent is that one of the KCS board of governors is nominated by King's College London.

Academics 

All members of the Sixth Form currently study either the IB Diploma or the A-Level course, and all members of the Fifth Form take GCSE qualifications. Due to the impact of the Covid-19 Pandemic results were not published during the 2019-2020 or 2020-2021 academic years.

GCSE summary: 2016-2022

A level summary: 2016-2022

International Baccalaureate Results: 2016-2022

Facilities

KCS occupies a 20-acre site on the south side of Wimbledon Common and owns a boathouse on Putney Embankment and two additional playing-fields in Raynes Park and Motspur Park.

In 2010 the school began to renovate and expand its facilities, which was completed in 2019. This included a new sports pavilion (2011), quadrangle and netball court (2015), classroom block (2016), music school (2018) and sports centre (2019).

Houses 

There are six Houses, each named after a previous head or notable Old Boy. Boys wear a standard red and blue striped school tie until they achieve six house points, at which point they are awarded the right to wear a house tie of navy blue with thin stripes of the following colours.

Green: Alverstone House, named after Richard Webster, 1st Viscount Alverstone (barrister, politician and judge, died 1915)
Blue: Glenesk House, named after Algernon Borthwick, 1st Baron Glenesk (journalist, editor and newspaper proprietor, died 1908)
Purple: Kingsley House, named after Henry Kingsley (gold prospector, mounted policeman, novelist, newspaper editor and war correspondent, died 1876)
Red: Layton House, named after Walter Layton, 1st Baron Layton (economist, editor and newspaper proprietor, died 1966)
Silver: Maclear House, named after George Frederick Maclear (the school's second head, who served 1866–1880)
Yellow: Major House, named after John Richardson Major (the school's first head, who served 1831–1866)

Further ties are awarded to members of the Sixth Form. In order of increasing seniority, these are: the House Prefect's tie (bold stripes of dark blue and a house colour with a single red crest), School Colours (navy blue with a single red school crest), the School Prefect's tie (red with blue school crests), and the Senior Prefect's tie (blue with red school crests). Girls receive badges as an alternative to ties.

The Senior Prefects consist of two Captains and two Vice-Captains of School and one Captain and two Vice-Captains of each house. In addition, each house typically has about 8 School Prefects as well as House Prefects.

King's College Junior School 

King's College Junior School (also known as KCJS) is the preparatory school for King's College School located in Wimbledon, London, is on the same campus as King's College Senior school. It was established in its own right in 1912, and educates boys from ages 7–11.

The junior school admits about 85 boys each year in three groups:
 At 7+ it takes about 54 boys and has approximately 6 applicants for every place. Applicant numbers at this stage are increasing.
 At 8+ it takes about 14 boys and has approximately 14 applicants for every place. Applicant numbers at this stage are increasing.
 At 9+ it takes about 12 boys and has approximately 8 applicants for every place. Applicant numbers at this stage are steady.

The first two years (3-4) are collectively referred to as 'Rushmere' (as they are taught in Rushmere House), while the final two years (5-6) are called 'Priory'. 2021/2022 Fees are £6,425 per term for years 3–4, and £6,930 per term for years 5–6.

As of September 2021 the headmaster is Ted Lougher.

The uniform is a red blazer with an emblem in blue on the right chest pocket. Every boy wears a white shirt, grey shorts or trousers, and ties similar to the Senior School ties.

All boys are allocated to one of the school's four houses when they join (siblings are placed into the same house):

 Norman (Black)
 Stuart (Green)
 Tudor (Blue)
 Windsor (Yellow)

King's College School overseas 

China – King's supports Shanghai-based education provider Dipont in establishing schools in China. The first two schools, RDFZ King's College School Hangzhou and Nanwai King's College School Wuxi opened in September 2018. The educational concept brings together schools RDFZ Beijing (Hangzhou) and Nanjing Foreign Language School (Wuxi) from China and King's College School Wimbledon; both schools cater for local Chinese and international students aged 3–18.

Thailand - King's College International School Bangkok opened in opened its doors in September 2020 to over 300 boys and girls aged two to ten. At capacity, the school will cater for 1,500 students from pre-school to Year 13 who will be prepared for IGCSE, A level and admission to leading universities. XET will own, manage and operate the school and King's Wimbledon will provide guidance on the curriculum, pastoral care and co-curricular programme to ensure that the King's ethos is closely replicated.

Monaco - Founded in 1994, the International School of Monaco (ISM) is a co-educational school with approximately 670 students aged 3 to 18. There is a bilingual programme for English and French in its early years and primary school. In the senior school the medium of instruction is English, offering IGCSEs in years 10 and 11 and the IB Diploma programme in the sixth form. The ISM is seeking to become a leading international school in Europe, and King's College School, Wimbledon, will work closely with their team in all areas of school life to achieve its goals. King's will share its ethos and how it delivers academic excellence, outstanding pastoral care and a comprehensive co-curricular provision. King's will also provide staff training and ongoing quality assurance. This new partnership will include exciting opportunities for students and staff at King's and the ISM.

Heads of King's College School

The following have been heads of King's College School:

Other Notable Masters

J.S. Cotman (1782-1842), Art Master
G.P.G. Rossetti (1783-1854), Italian Master
M.E. Cotman (1810-1858), Assistant Art Master
A.J. Fletcher (1941-), History Master
R. Hiller (1942-), Mathematics Master
G.P. Butcher (1975-), Cricket Master

Notable Old King's Boys

19th-century births
Edward Arber, (1836-1912) scholar, writer and editor
Marcus Beresford, (1818–1890) Conservative Party politician and Colonel in the 7th Surrey Rifle Volunteers
J. D. Casswell, QC, (1886 – 1963) barrister, holds the record for saving more from being hanged in the UK than any other. Also served as a Major in World War I.
Sir Monier Monier-Williams, (1819–1899) oriental scholar
George Devey, (1820–1886) architect
Arthur Cayley, (1821–1895) mathematician
William Ince, (1825–1910) Regius Professor of Divinity in the University of Oxford
Jacob Wrey Mould, (1825–1886) architect, renowned for designing Central Park
Alfred Barry, (1826–1910) Anglican Archbishop of Sydney
William Burges, (1827–1881) Victorian art-architect
George William Kitchin, (1827–1912) theologian and the first Chancellor of the University of Durham
Dante Gabriel Rossetti, (1828–1882) Pre-Raphaelite painter
Edward Dutton Cook, (1829–1883) dramatic critic and author
Henry Parry Liddon, (1829–1890) theologian
Algernon Borthwick, 1st Baron Glenesk, (1830–1908) journalist and Conservative Party politician
Charles Harbord, 5th Baron Suffield, (1830–1914) Liberal Party peer and Master of the Buckhounds
Henry Kingsley, (1830–1876) novelist
Frederic Harrison, (1831–1923) jurist and historian
Henry Jones, (1831–1899) writer and authority on tennis and card games, instrumental in establishing the Wimbledon Tennis Championships
Henry Fawcett, (1833–1884) blind British economist, statesman, academic and campaigner for women's suffrage.
Felix Stone Moscheles, (1833–1917) painter, peace activist and advocate of Esperanto
Sabine Baring-Gould, (1834–1924) Hagiographer, antiquarian and hymn writer, the best known of which is Onward, Christian Soldiers
William Henry Preece, (1834–1913) electrical engineer
William Grantham, (1835–1911) Conservative Party politician and High Court Judge
Walter William Skeat, (1835–1912) philologist
Charles Dickens Jr., (1837–1896) geographic dictionary compiler, and son of the author Charles Dickens
John Festing, (1837–1902) Bishop of St. Albans
Sidney Godolphin Alexander Shippard, (1838–1902) British colonial administrator
Edward Robert Festing, (1839–1912) Army officer and first Director of The Science Museum
Ingram Bywater, (1840–1914) classical scholar
Alfred de Rothschild, (1842–1918) Director of the Bank of England
Richard Webster, 1st Viscount Alverstone, (1842–1915) Attorney-General, barrister and Conservative Party politician
William Turner Thiselton-Dyer, (1843–1928) drector of the Royal Botanic Gardens
William P. Treloar, (1843–1923) Lord Mayor of London
William Christie, (1845–1922) Astronomer Royal
Leopold de Rothschild, (1845–1917) banker and thoroughbred race horse breeder
George Saintsbury, (1845–1933) writer and critic
Henry Sweet, (1845–1912) philologist
Henry Kemble, (1848–1907) actor and member of the famed Kemble family
John Milne, (1849–1913) geologist and mining engineer
James Drake, (1850–1941) Australian politician
Frederic Henry Chase, (1853–1925) academic and Bishop of Ely
Alfred Milner, 1st Viscount Milner, (1854–1925) Liberal Party statesman and colonial administrator
Gordon Smith, (1856–1905) barrister and philatelist
Andrew Watson, (1856–1921) the world's first black association football player to play at international level
Sidney Low, (1857–1932) journalist and historian
Sir Jeremiah Colman, 1st Baronet, (1859–1942) industrialist, Chairman of Colman's Mustard
Walter Sickert, (1860–1942) English Impressionist painter, suspected of being Jack the Ripper
James Edward Edmonds, (1861–1956) official British historian of World War I
Reginald McKenna, (1863–1943) Home Secretary and Chancellor of the Exchequer
John Martin-Harvey, (1863–1944) actor
George Hillyard, (1864–1943) tennis player, Olympic gold medallist, Middlesex cricketer and naval officer
Charles Sanford Terry, (1864–1936) historian and musicologist
Ernest Starling, (1866–1927) physiologist, discovered hormones, developed the 'law of the heart', and involved in the Brown Dog Affair
Rowland Blades, 1st Baron Ebbisham, (1868–1953) Conservative Party politician and Lord Mayor of London
Lynwood Palmer (1868–1941) painter of racehorses and carriage horses.
Skinner Turner, (1868–1935) Chief Judge of the British Supreme Court for China
George Holt Thomas, (1869–1929) aviation pioneer and founder of Imperial Airways
Percy Newberry, (1869–1949) Egyptologist, introduced Howard Carter to Egypt, and served on staff Tutankhamun excavations
Frederick Field (Royal Navy officer), (1871–1945) First Sea Lord
Henry Poole, (1873–1928) sculptor
Ellis Martin, (1881–1977) map cover illustrator for Ordnance Survey
John Barrymore, (1882–1942) actor and member of the famed Barrymore family
Walter Layton, 1st Baron Layton, (1884–1966) statesman and editor
Gilbert Szlumper, (1884–1969) General Manager of the Southern Railway
Henry Monck-Mason Moore, (1887–1964) British Governor of Sierra Leone, Kenya and Ceylon
Victor Negus, (1887–1974) laryngologist, surgeon and comparative anatomist
Frederick Sowrey, (1893–1968) World War I flying ace
Richard Walther Darré, (1895–1953) Nazi ideologist and long-serving Reich Minister of Food and Agriculture
Robert Graves, (1895–1985) poet and novelist, who mentions his brief spell at the school in his autobiography Goodbye to All That
John G. Bennett, (1897–1974) mathematician, scientist, technologist, industrial research director, and author
Edwin Flavell, (1898–1993) military commander

20th century births

Khalid Abdalla, (1980–) actor and star of United 93, The Kite Runner and Green Zone
Leonard Addison, (1902-1975) British Indian Army officer
Angus Allan, (1936–2007) comic strip writer
Clive Aslet, (1955–) writer and former editor of Country Life
Tom Audley, (1986–) Rugby Union Player for London Welsh
Robert Ayling, (1946–) former CEO of British Airways
Ben Barnes, (1981–) actor and star of The Chronicles of Narnia: Prince Caspian and Stardust
Tom Basden, (1981–) comedian
James Binney, (1950–) astrophysicist
Andrew Black, (1963–) founder of Betfair, an internet betting exchange
Sir Cyril Black, (1902–1991) MP and financier
Sir James Bottomley, (1920–2013) diplomat
Tom Browne, (1945–) broadcaster and actor
Raymond Buckland, (1934–2017) author
Michael Cardew, (1901–1983) master potter
Roger Casale, (1960–) MP for Wimbledon 
Christopher Challis, (1919–2012) cinematographer
Sir Neil Chalmers, (1942–) former Director of the Natural History Museum
John Cloake, (1924–2014) former Ambassador of the United Kingdom to Bulgaria
Sir Ralph Cusack, (1916–1978) High Court judge
Sir John Vivian Dacie, (1912–2005) haematologist
Nick D'Aloisio, (1995–) entrepreneur and youngest person to have raised VC funding in the world
Guy de la Bédoyère, (1957–) writer and broadcaster
Nigel Don, (1954–) SNP MSP for Angus North and Mearns
Jimmy Edwards, (1920–1988) 1950s British radio and television comedy actor
George S. J. Faber, (1959–) television producer
Ed Gamble, (1986–) comedian
Sir Victor Goodhew, (1919–2006) politician, Conservative MP for St Albans
Nigel Green, (1924–1972) actor
Conal Gregory, (1947–) politician, MP for York
Cifford Hall, (1904–1973) painter
The Right Reverend David Halsey, (1919–2009) former Bishop of Carlisle
Frank Robinson Hartley, chemist, Vice-Chancellor Cranfield University 1989–2006
Rupert Hine, (1947-2020) musician, former Chairman of The Ivor Novello Awards
Robin Holloway, (1943–) composer
Peter Horrocks, (1959–) former director of BBC World Service
David Hughes, (1930–2005) novelist
Ross Hutchins, (1985–) professional tennis player
Robert Jay, (1959–) Counsel to the Leveson Inquiry (2011–2012), and now High Court Judge
William Joyce, (1906–1946) Nazi propagandist (as "Lord Haw-Haw") and fascist politician
Alvar Lidell, (1908–1981) BBC radio announcer
Roger Lockyer, (1927–2017) historian
Ben Lovett, (1987–) musician and member of the band Mumford and Sons
Mark Lowen, BBC news correspondent
James Mitchell, (1989–) professional poker player, took part in the Irish Poker Open.
Jonathan Montgomery, (1962–) British legal scholar who specialises in health care law.
Peter G. Moore, (1928–2010) British soldier, actuary, academic and statistician
Simon Conway Morris FRS, (1951–) evolutionary palaeobiologist
Buster Mottram, (1955–) professional tennis player, who achieved a highest world ranking of fifteenth.
Marcus Mumford, (1987–) musician and founder of the band Mumford and Sons
Andrew Hunter Murray (1987 -) QI, Austentatious
David Nokes, (1948–2009) literary scholar and biographer
Dudley Owen-Thomas, (1948–) lawyer and former first-class cricketer
Richard Pasco CBE, (1926–2014) stage, screen and TV actor
Roy Plomley, (1914–1985) broadcaster and creator of the BBC radio programme Desert Island Discs
Andrew Powell, (1949–) musician
Gaby Rado, (1955–2003) television journalist
Sir Stephen Richards, (1950–) Appeal Court judge
Prince Alexander Romanov, (1929–2002) great nephew of the last Russian Emperor, Nicholas II
Joe Salisbury, (1992-) professional tennis player 
Ronald A. Sandison, (1916–2010) psychiatrist, pioneered the clinical use of LSD in the UK.
Michael Scott, (1981–) classicist, author and broadcaster
David Shaw (1950–2022), politician, former MP for Dover
Dan Smith (1986–), lead singer of indie band Bastille
Andrew Stuart (1962–) mathematician
Joby Talbot, (1971–) composer
Simon Treves, (1957–) actor and writer
Mark Urban, (1961–) journalist, author & Diplomatic Editor of BBC's Newsnight programme
Stuart Urban, (1959–) film and television director
Chris van Tulleken, (1978–) Doctor and TV presenter including CBBC series Operation Ouch!
Xand van Tulleken, (1978–) Doctor and TV presenter including CBBC series Operation Ouch!
Patrick Wolf, né Patrick Apps, (1983–) singer-songwriter
Nadhim Zahawi, (1967–) MP for Stratford-on-Avon

21st century births
Arthur Fery, (2002–) professional tennis player

Victoria Cross holders
Five Old King's have been awarded the Victoria Cross.

Mark Sever Bell, Ashanti War, awarded the Victoria Cross
William George Cubitt, Indian Mutiny, awarded the Victoria Cross
Philip Salkeld, Indian Mutiny, awarded the Victoria Cross
Arthur Scarf, World War II, awarded the Victoria Cross
Robert Haydon Shebbeare, Indian Mutiny, awarded the Victoria Cross

Alumni associations
The principal society for former pupils of the school is the Old King's Club, founded in 1884. The school promotes membership amongst recently departed pupils, for whom membership of the club is free.

A number of alumni also join the East India Club, formerly the Public Schools Club, on discounted membership.

King's College School Lodge number 4257 is the masonic lodge associated with King's College School. It is governed by the United Grand Lodge of England and administered by the Metropolitan Grand Lodge. Meetings are held four times per year at the school. The Warrant of the Lodge was issued on 23 February 1921 and it was consecrated at Freemasons' Hall, London, on 3 May 1921.

See also 
King's College School Boat Club
List of independent schools in England

References

External links

 
 King's Club Website
 Old King's Club Website
 KCS Lodge Website
 KCS Old Boys RFC Website
 Accounts for KCS available from the UK Charity Commission

1829 establishments in England
Educational institutions established in 1829
History of King's College London
Private schools in the London Borough of Merton
Private boys' schools in London
Private co-educational schools in London
International Baccalaureate schools in England
Member schools of the Headmasters' and Headmistresses' Conference
 
Schools with a royal charter
Buildings and structures in Wimbledon, London
University-affiliated secondary schools